The 2023 Hockey East Women's Ice Hockey Tournament was the 21st edition of the Women's Hockey East Tournament. It was played between February 22 and March 4, 2023. The championship was hosted by the highest remaining seed, Northeastern. Northeastern defeated Providence 4–1 to earn their 6th straight tournament championship. They earned the conference's automatic bid into the 2023 NCAA National Collegiate women's ice hockey tournament.

Format
The tournament included all ten teams in the conference. Teams were ranked according to their finish in the conference standings. Seeds 1–6 earned a bye into the quarterfinal round, while seeds 7–10 played to determine the remaining quarterfinalists. Winners in the opening round were reseeded and advanced to play top two seeds in reverse order. Winners of the quarterfinal matches were again reseeded for the semifinal, and the winners of those two games faced off in the championship.

All series were single-elimination with opening round and quarterfinal matches occurring at home team sites. The semifinals were hosted at the two highest remaining team sites. The championship was hosted at the highest remaining seeds site. The tournament champion receives an automatic bid into the 2023 NCAA National Collegiate women's ice hockey tournament.

Standings

Bracket
Teams are reseeded after the Opening Round and Quarterfinals

Note: * denotes overtime period(s)

Results

Opening Round

(10) Merrimack at (7) Boston University

(9) Holy Cross at (8) New Hampshire

Quarterfinals

(7) New Hampshire at (2) Vermont

(8) Merrimack at (1) Northeastern

(5) Connecticut at (4) Boston College

(6) Maine at (3) Providence

Semifinals

(4) Boston College at (1) Northeastern

(3) Providence at (2) Vermont

Championship

(3) Providence at (1) Northeastern

Tournament Awards

All Tournament Team 
Goalie: Gwyneth Philips- NortheasternDefense: Brooke Becker- ProvidenceDefense: Megan Carter- NortheasternForward: Peyton Anderson- NortheasternForward: Alina Müller- NortheasternForward: Maureen Murphy- Northeastern

Tournament MVP 
Alina Müller- Northeastern

References

External links
2023 Hockey East Women's Ice Hockey Tournament

College sports in Massachusetts
Ice hockey in Boston
Hockey East Women's Ice Hockey Tournament
Hockey East Women's Ice Hockey Tournament
Hockey East Women's Ice Hockey Tournament
Hockey East Women's Ice Hockey Tournament